Proprioseiopsis badryi is a species of mite in the family Phytoseiidae.

References

badryi
Articles created by Qbugbot
Animals described in 1986